Pagels is a surname. Notable people with the surname include:

 Elaine Pagels (born 1943), American theologian
 Eva Pagels (born 1954), German field hockey player
 Georges-Guillaume Pagels (1855–1897), Swedish officer in the service of the International African Association
 Heinz Pagels (1939–1988), American physicist
 Tietje Spannenburg-Pagels (1906 - after 1933), Dutch speed skater

See also
 Pagel, a surname

German-language surnames
Surnames from given names